Gaocun, formerly Gaocun township, is a town in Wuqing District in the northwest of Tianjin Municipality. It is located half-way between the city centres of Beijing and Tianjin at the Gaocun exit on the Jingjintang Expressway.

Gaocun was promoted from village status to township status in 2013 at around the same time when the region underwent rapid development. Beijing Capital Land has invested billions of Chinese yuan into the Gaocun area by building a Science Park, an international school called Haileybury International School, Widsom Plaza and Jingjinhui entertainment complex. Two shopping malls are currently under construction.

Administrative divisions 
In 2017, Gaocun town incorporated the following residential communities and villages:

Residential communities:
Niuzhen, Taitou

Villages:
Gaocun, Lancheng, Houhoushang, Renzhuang, Jianchang, Yongxingzhuang, Zhonghan, Dazhou, Xiaozhou, Lilao and Tianhu.

Former villages:
 Niu Village 1, Niu Village 2, Niu Village 3, Niu Village 4, and Taitou

Lifestyle

Residential areas 
Taitou residential compound is a lively community of around 1,000 Chinese residents and around 30 expatriate teachers employed by Haileybury International School.

Transportation 
Residents use a combination of electric cars, hybrid vehicles, petrol cars, electric rickshaws and bicycles to commute around the local area.

Places of interest

Places of interest in Gaocun 

 Gaocun Township People's Government, Gaocun main street
 Beckham Burger Restaurant, Gaocun main street
 Gaocun Farmers' Market (only open between sunrise and noon on days whose lunar date ends with an odd-numbered digit that is not 7)

Places of interest at Wisdom Plaza (under construction) 

 Face-to-Face Noodle Bar, Wisdom Plaza
 Beijing Institute of Big Data Research, Wisdom Plaza
 Apple'tree (restaurant and yoga studio), Wisdom Plaza
 GreenGo electric car rental service

Places of interest in Taitou 

Taitou residential compound
 Family Destiny Restaurant (known colloquially by the expatriate community as the "Dirty Dragon")
 Taitou intercity bus station (outside Taitou West Gate), which has at two buses to south-east Beijing each day

Places of interest around rural Gaocun township 

Haileybury International School
Pinwei, a Chinese restaurant half-way between Taitou and Haileybury International School
Central Park (a paved, landscaped, tree-lined park 6.5 kilometres in circumference
Road corn

References 

Towns in Tianjin